Antonia Lottner was the defending champion, but withdrew before the tournament started.

Mihaela Buzărnescu won the title, defeating Barbara Haas in the final, 6–0, 6–2.

Seeds

Draw

Finals

Top half

Bottom half

References
Main Draw

Reinert Open - Singles
Reinert Open